The Unadilla Valley Railway was a shortline railroad company that operated in the Unadilla Valley of upstate New York from its opening in 1895 to its abandonment in 1960. From 1937 onwards, it was owned by the H.E. Salzberg Company.

Originally only running between New Berlin and Bridgewater, the railroad later purchased the New Berlin Branch from the New York, Ontario, and Western Railroad in 1941, doubling its trackage. The railroad purchased its first diesel locomotive from General Electric in 1947, but continued running steam locomotives until 1956.

References 

Defunct New York (state) railroads
Railway companies disestablished in 1960
Railway companies established in 1895
1895 establishments in New York (state)